Philipp Manning (23 November 1869 – 9 April 1951) was a British-born German actor. He was born in Lewisham to a British father and a German mother. He was sent to Germany for his education and settled there. He often played British characters in German films, including in Nazi propaganda ones. He died in Waldshut-Tiengen.

Selected filmography

 Circus of Life (1921)
 The Inheritance (1922)
 Lucrezia Borgia (1922)
 Rose of the Asphalt Streets (1922)
 The Ancient Law (1923)
 Friedrich Schiller (1923)
 The Comedian's Child (1923)
 Time Is Money (1923)
 Heart of Stone (1924)
 Dudu, a Human Destiny (1924)
 Darling of the King (1924)
 Bismarck (1925)
 Express Train of Love (1925)
 Ship in Distress (1925)
 Shadows of the Metropolis (1925)
 Frisian Blood (1925)
 Superfluous People (1926)
 The Woman's Crusade (1926)
 Professor Imhof  (1926)
 Love's Joys and Woes (1926)
 Maytime (1926)
 The Young Man from the Ragtrade (1926)
 Chance the Idol (1927)
 German Women - German Faithfulness (1927)
 Did You Fall in Love Along the Beautiful Rhine? (1927)
 Klettermaxe (1927)
 The Man with the Counterfeit Money (1927)
 Storm Tide (1927)
  Eva and the Grasshopper (1927)
 The Impostor (1927)
  The Tragedy of a Lost Soul (1927)
 The Lady and the Chauffeur (1928)
 Spy of Madame Pompadour (1928)
 Master and Mistress (1928)
 His Strongest Weapon (1928)
 Man Against Man (1928)
 Behind Monastery Walls (1928)
 Volga Volga (1928)
 Panic (1928)
 I Lost My Heart on a Bus (1929)
 The Love of the Brothers Rott (1929)
 Midnight Taxi (1929)
  Painted Youth (1929)
 Atlantik (1929)
Land Without Women (1929)
 His Best Friend (1929)
 Napoleon at St. Helena (1929)
 The Last Company (1930)
 Father and Son (1930)
 A Student's Song of Heidelberg (1930)
 Police Spy 77 (1930)
 Woman in the Jungle (1931)
 Moritz Makes his Fortune (1931)
 The Adventurer of Tunis (1931)
 A Storm Over Zakopane (1931)
  Grock (1931)
 Congress Dances (1932)
 The White Demon (1932)
 The Dancer of Sanssouci (1932)
 Marshal Forwards (1932)
 The Escape to Nice (1932)
 Ship Without a Harbour (1932)
 Today Is the Day (1933)
 The Legacy of Pretoria (1934)
 Miss Liselott (1934)
 The World Without a Mask (1934)
 A Night on the Danube (1935)
 The Schimeck Family (1935)
 City of Anatol (1936)
 Stjenka Rasin (1936)
 The Call of the Jungle (1936)
 A Woman of No Importance (1936)
 Gewitterflug zu Claudia (1937)
 His Best Friend (1937)
 Woman's Love—Woman's Suffering (1937)
  Storms in May (1938)
 Men, Animals and Sensations (1938)
 Robert Koch (1939)
 Carl Peters (1941)
 The Endless Road (1943)

Bibliography
 Eisner, Lotte H. The Haunted Screen: Expressionism in the German Cinema and the Influence of Max Reinhardt. University of California Press, 2008.

External links

1869 births
1951 deaths
German male film actors
English male film actors
People from Lewisham
20th-century English male actors
20th-century German male actors
English emigrants to Germany
English people of German descent